Harold Austin (8 March 1903 – 31 July 1981) was an Australian cricketer. He played six first-class cricket matches for Victoria in 1925.

See also
 List of Victoria first-class cricketers
 List of Cambridge University Cricket Club players

References

External links
 

1903 births
1981 deaths
Australian cricketers
Victoria cricketers
Cambridge University cricketers